The Idiotmaker's Gravity Tour is a 2011 American independent comedy-drama film starring William Cully Allen, Glenn Walsh, K.J. Linhein, Pappu Rai, Peter Brunette, Erin Lovett Sherman, Alanna Blair, William McKeever and written and directed by Daniel Kremer.

Plot
Max Plugin is a jaded but flamboyant relic of the 1960s. In his teens, Max ran away to California, where he met Teschlock, a charismatic ascetic and guru renowned among a small group of young followers. At that time, when Teschlock asked Max to join him and his disciples on an ashram in India, Max declined and returned home. Now, forty years later, at age 57, Max takes a journey to India to find Teschlock's grave-site, and also himself. His adventures in India, and his Castaneda-esque experiences back home, form the heart of this very unusual road movie.

Production
The Idiotmaker's Gravity Tour was filmed predominantly in Varanasi, Uttar Pradesh, India, starting in the fall of 2010, with production ending a little less than a year later, in August 2011.  The film was released in September 2011.

Reception
Independent filmmaking icon Rob Nilsson called the film, "a no-budget, do-it-yourself excursion to India from a filmmaker of considerable enterprise and admirable aplomb." Director Daniel Kremer was interviewed for both Around Philly and Philly Broadcaster around the time of the film's release.

Cast

William Cully Allen as Maxwell Abraham Lowell Plugin
Glenn Walsh as Amos Ligett
K.J. Linhein as Mordecai Teschlock
Pappu Rai as Pappu
Peter Brunette as Peter Pilot
Erin Lovett Sherman as Gi
Julie Edelstein as Nessa
William McKeever as Walt Sannfield
Alanna Blair as Megan the Végan
Beth Grant as Carla
Taryn Power as Anita
Catherine Genender as Lily
Hildy Brooks as Mary
Jackie O'Brien as Janet (credited as Jacqueline Woolsey)
Sherry Boucher as Maria (credited as Sherry Boucher-Lytle)
Savannah Smith Boucher as Eloise
Aloma Ichinose as Joanna
Toni Basil as Jackie

References

Sources

2011 films
American comedy-drama films
2011 comedy-drama films
2010s English-language films
2010s American films